The third USS Pigeon (ASR–21) was the lead ship of her class of submarine rescue ships. Laid down on 17 July 1968 by the Alabama Dry Dock and Shipbuilding Co., Mobile, Alabama, the ship was launched on 13 August 1969, sponsored by Mrs. Allen M. Shinn, wife of Vice Admiral Shinn, Commander Naval Air Force, U.S. Pacific Fleet, and commissioned on 28 April 1973.

Design
The leader of a new class of submarine rescue ships designed to operate with the Navy's new deep submergence rescue vehicles, Pigeon was the first seagoing catamaran warship built for the Navy since Robert Fulton's twin-hulled steam warship Fulton was built at the close of the War of 1812. Her twin hull gave great stability for deep water operations and provides ample deck working space. She was able to carry two deep submergence vehicles on her main deck. These craft were capable of docking to a disabled submarine on the sea bottom, removing survivors and transporting them to the surface. Pigeon also carried the McCann diving bell or rescue chamber of the type which was used to rescue the survivors of submarine  in 1939. Pigeons mooring system enabled her to maintain a precise position over a disabled submarine during rescue operations.

Pigeon's rescue control center used a three-dimensional sonar system for continuous tracking of the rescue vehicle. During rescue operations it served as a floating command post with specialized communications equipment for contacting the disabled submarine and any other craft, planes or ships working with her.

Struck from Naval Register on 31 August 1992, Pigeon was laid up in National Defense Reserve Fleet, Suisun Bay Group. On 18 December 1998, the vessel was transferred to the Maritime Administration for disposal. However, training requirements at Fleet Training Center San Diego (FTC San Diego) identified a need for this vessel. It was reacquired by the U.S. Navy on 23 March 2002 and tied-up at Pier 11 (across from West 19th Street), Naval Base San Diego, as a non-operational training platform.

During the period of 2002 to 2005, Pigeon was used by the Naval Education and Training Command's Center for Security Forces (CENSECFOR; Master-at-arms) to conduct pier-side anti-terrorism Counter-terrorism/Security forces (AT/SF) training. CENSECFOR developed the curriculum for classroom training, and provided the on-site instructions aboard Pigeon. Curriculum and administrative support services were provided by Training Support Center San Diego (TSC San Diego; previously FTC San Diego). In October 2004, Pigeon was designated to be replaced by a new harden training structure constructed ashore (adjacent to waterfront) to continue AT/SF training. A source selection evaluation board chaired by Dr. Stephen Berrey (Director of TSC San Diego/Training Facility Department) was formed to ultimately have Pigeon transferred to the Suisun Bay Reserve Fleet (SBRF). In coordination with Fleet and Industrial Supply Center San Diego (FISCSD), Dr. Berrey arranged with the staff of Commander, Sealift Logistics Command Pacific (SEALOGPAC) to provide towing support by USNS Sioux (T-ATF-171) from Naval Base San Diego to Suisun Bay. Additionally, contractual arrangements were made with Crowley Marine Services, Inc. who provided tractor tug towing services from San Pablo Strait to the SBRF basin, Benicia, California. The Pigeon vessel was placed at Anchorage 5, in September 2005.

Pigeon was towed to Brownsville, Texas for scrapping in January 2012.

In fiction
In Tom Clancy's novel The Hunt for Red October,  USS Pigeon was the ship that rescued Soviet seamen from renegade ballistic missile submarine Red October after Captain Ramius fakes a shipboard emergency.

USS Pigeon and her DSRV were prominently featured in the 1978 disaster film Gray Lady Down.

References

External links
 
 globalsecurity.org: ASR 21 Pigeon
 Federation of American Scientists: ASR 21 Pigeon

 

Pigeon-class submarine rescue ships
Ships built in Mobile, Alabama
1969 ships